Harry Harrison may refer to:

Harry Harrison (architect), American architect
Harry Harrison (Australian footballer) (1901–1972), Australian rules footballer
Harry Harrison (cartoonist) (born 1961), British-born political cartoonist and illustrator
Harry Harrison (DJ) (1930–2020), American radio personality
Harry Harrison (English footballer) (1893 – 1975), English football goalkeeper
Harry Harrison (writer) (1925–2012), American science fiction author
Harry N. Harrison (died 1947), British trade unionist
Harry Harrison Kroll

See also
Henry Harrison (disambiguation)
Harold Harrison (disambiguation)